Estelle Harris (née Nussbaum; April 22, 1928 – April 2, 2022) was an American actress and comedienne, known for her exaggerated shrill, grating voice. She was best known for her role as Estelle Costanza on Seinfeld. Her other roles included the voice of Mrs. Potato Head in the Toy Story franchise, Muriel in The Suite Life of Zack & Cody, and Mama Gunda in Tarzan II. During her career, Harris starred in various television commercials.

Early life and education
Harris was born Estelle Nussbaum in the Hell's Kitchen neighborhood of Manhattan, New York on April 22, 1928, the younger of two daughters of Isaac ("Ira") and Anna Nussbaum, Polish Jewish immigrants who owned a candy store and soda shop. For many years, her date of birth was mistakenly cited as April 4, 1928. The correct date was not revealed until after her death. In 1935, when she was seven years old, the family relocated to Tarentum, Pennsylvania. She graduated from Tarentum High School.

Career

Harris began her career in amateur productions and in dinner theater before moving on to regional theaters and summer stock productions across the country.

She later found success on Madison Avenue as she appeared in as many as 25 national television commercials in a single year, earning her the nickname "Queen of Commercials."

After her children grew up, Harris pursued acting and achieved early success in television commercials, even logging 23 spots in a year at one point. In one of her most-famous commercials, she energetically sang the praises of Handi-Wrap II.

In 1977, Harris began her long format acting career in the film Looking Up about three generations of a working class Jewish family in New York City. She became widely known for her supporting role as Estelle Costanza on Seinfeld. "She is the mother that everybody loves, even though she's a pain in the neck," Harris told the Pittsburgh Post-Gazette in 1998. Despite her iconic role, she was highly reclusive.

In Star Trek: Voyager, she portrayed the old woman who was actually a projection of the Nechani Spirits in the third-season episode "Sacred Ground," which aired on October 20, 1996. She played a small role as Bridget in Out to Sea (1997).

In Toy Story 2 (1999), she provided the voice of Mrs. Potato Head and would continue to reprise the role for the rest of the franchise. In 2005, she lent her voice to Mama Gunda in Tarzan II. In The Suite Life of Zack & Cody, Harris had a recurring role as Muriel. In 2007, she appeared in Brad Paisley's music video for the song "Online." Harris reprised her role of Mrs. Potato Head in Toy Story 3 (2010). She portrayed Bertha Kristal, the mother of CBGB founder Hilly Kristal, in CBGB (2013).

Her other voice work included Lula in Dave the Barbarian, Mama Lipsky in Kim Possible, Thelma in The Proud Family, Mrs. Turtle in Mickey Mouse Works and House of Mouse, Death's mother in Family Guy, the Old Lady Bear in Brother Bear (2003), and Audrey in Home on the Range (2004). She also provided the voice of Marty's wife in the American Dad! episode "In Country...Club." She appeared in Promoted (2015) as Sylvia Silver. Harris retired from acting in 2015.

Harris came out of her retirement to reprise her role of Mrs. Potato Head in Toy Story 4 (2019), which was her final film role.

Personal life and death
In 1952, after moving back to New York, Harris met window treatment salesman Sy Harris at a dance. Six months later, they were married. They had two sons, Eric (born 1957) and Glen (born 1961), and a daughter Taryn (born 1964). Eric is a social worker, Glen is a music promoter who doubled as his mother's unofficial manager, and Taryn is a former Nassau County police officer retired on disability. Harris also had three grandsons and one great-grandson. Once her children started school, Harris pursued acting roles, first in amateur productions, then dinner theatre and commercials.

On September 20, 2001, the couple's car blew a tire and flipped twice, but they managed to escape serious injuries. Sy Harris died on January 11, 2021, predeceasing his wife by one year.

On April 2, 2022, Harris died of natural causes at her home in Palm Desert, California, at the age of 93.

Filmography

Film

Television

Video games

References

External links
 
 
 

1928 births
2022 deaths
20th-century American actresses
21st-century American actresses
Actresses from New York City
American film actresses
American musical theatre actresses
American people of Polish-Jewish descent
American television actresses
American voice actresses
American women comedians
Comedians from Pennsylvania
Jewish American actresses
Jewish American comedians
Jewish American female comedians
People from Hell's Kitchen, Manhattan
People from Tarentum, Pennsylvania